Lothoo Singh Nitharwal (1804–1855) was a Jat freedom fighter from Rajasthan, India. He wanted to overturn the role of the East India Company in India, establish democracy and also free people from exploitation by jagirdars. His best friend was Karna Meena.

Nitharwal is referred to by numerous other names, including Lothoo Jat, Lothoo Singh, Lothoo Ram, Loth, Lothan, Lot, Lotia, and Lohat.

References

1804 births
1855 deaths
Rajasthani people
Indian revolutionaries
People from Sikar district